Petržela (Czech feminine: Petrželová) is a Moravian surname. It may refer to:

 Jan Petržela (born 1992), Czech orienteer
 Milan Petržela (born 1983), Czech footballer
 Natalia Mehlman Petrzela, American historian
 Vlastimil Petržela (born 1953), Czech football manager

See also
 

Czech-language surnames